I13 may refer to:

 Dalarna Regiment, a Swedish Army infantry regiment
 Japanese submarine I-13, a submarine of the Japanese Imperial Navy
 Interstate 605, formerly proposed as Interstate 13